Iron–sulfur clusters are molecular ensembles of iron and sulfide.  They are most often discussed in the context of the biological role for iron–sulfur proteins, which are pervasive.  Many Fe–S clusters are known in the area of organometallic chemistry and as precursors to synthetic analogues of the biological clusters (see Figure). It is believed that the last universal common ancestor had many iron-sulfur clusters.

Organometallic clusters
Organometallic Fe–S clusters include the sulfido carbonyls with the formula Fe2S2(CO)6, H2Fe3S(CO)9, and Fe3S2(CO)9.  Compounds are also known that incorporate cyclopentadienyl ligands, such as (C5H5)4Fe4S4.

Inorganic materials

Biological Fe–S clusters

Iron–sulfur clusters occur in many biological systems, often as components of electron transfer proteins.  The ferredoxin proteins are the most common Fe–S clusters in nature.  They feature either 2Fe–2S or 4Fe–4S centers. They occur in all branches of life.

Fe–S clusters can be classified according to their Fe:S stoichiometry [2Fe–2S], [4Fe–3S], [3Fe–4S], and [4Fe–4S]. The [4Fe–4S] clusters occur in two forms: normal ferredoxins and high potential iron proteins (HiPIP). Both adopt cuboidal structures, but they utilize different oxidation states.  They are found in all forms of life.

The relevant redox couple in all Fe–S proteins is Fe(II)/Fe(III).

Many clusters have been synthesized in the laboratory with the formula [Fe4S4(SR)4]2−, which are known for many R substituents, and with many cations.  Variations have been prepared including the incomplete cubanes [Fe3S4(SR)3]3−.

The Rieske proteins contain Fe–S clusters that coordinate as a 2Fe–2S structure and can be found in the membrane bound cytochrome bc1 complex III in the mitochondria of eukaryotes and bacteria. They are also a part of the proteins of the chloroplast such as the cytochrome b6f complex in photosynthetic organisms. These photosynthetic organisms include plants, green algae, and cyanobacteria, the bacterial precursor to chloroplasts. Both are part of the electron transport chain of their respective organisms which is a crucial step in the energy harvesting for many organisms.

In some instances Fe–S clusters are redox-inactive, but are proposed to have structural roles. Examples include endonuclease III and MutY.

See also
 Bioinorganic chemistry

References

External links

Cluster chemistry
Iron compounds
Sulfur compounds